Motion tracker can refer to:

 motion detector, a device that utilizes a sensor to detect nearby motion
 motion capture, the process of recording the movement of objects or people